Sinan Oğan (born 1 September 1967) is a Turkish politician of Azerbaijani Turkish origin, who won a seat in the Turkish parliament in 2011 with the far-right Nationalist Movement Party (MHP).

Life and education 
Ogan was born on 1 September 1967 in Iğdır, Turkey. He graduated from the department of Management at Marmara University in 1989. From 1993 to 2000 Ogan worked as deputy dean at the Azerbaijan State Economic University. From 1994 to 1998, he also served as a representative of Turkish International Cooperation and Development Agency TİKA of Turkish Ministry of Foreign Affairs in an additional mission.
In 2000, he returned to Turkey and started working at the Center for Eurasian Strategic Studies on the Caucasus region. He laid the foundation of Center of International Relations and Strategic Analysis TURKSAM. Sinan OGAN is the author of books including ‘Azerbaijan’ which was published in 1992 on Turkic World Research Foundation Publications, ‘Politics and Oligarchy’published in Russia in 2003 and ‘Orange Revolutions’ published in 2006. More than 500 articles and analysis of Sinan OGAN are published. In 2009, Ogan obtained a PhD in international relations and political science from the Moscow State Institute of International Relations.

Awards and recognition 
 1992 Milliyet Newspaper Social Sciences Award
 1993  Marmara University Academic Award of Excellence
 Turkic World Service Award from Eurasia Economic Relations Association
 Honor Award from the Federation of Oghuz Tribe Cultural Associations.
 2011, he was awarded the Azerbaijan State Medal.
 2011 “Member of the Parliament (MP) of the Year” by the Telecommunication Workers Association.

References

External links 
 

1967 births
Deputies of Iğdır
Living people
People from Iğdır
Turkish people of Azerbaijani descent
Turkish Shia Muslims
Members of the 24th Parliament of Turkey
Nationalist Movement Party politicians